Fidel Amado Pérez (born October 19, 1980 in Ypané, Paraguay) is a Paraguayan footballer currently playing for Caracas FC of the Primera División in Venezuela.

Teams
  Guaraní 2002-2004
  Nacional 2004
  Cerro Porteño 2005-2010
  Sportivo Luqueño 2011
  Caracas FC 2012–present

See also
Football in Paraguay

References

External links
 Profile at BDFA 
 

1980 births
Living people
Paraguayan footballers
Paraguayan expatriate footballers
Club Guaraní players
Club Nacional footballers
Cerro Porteño players
Sportivo Luqueño players
Caracas FC players
Expatriate footballers in Venezuela
Association football defenders